Alan Keith Johnson (born 19 February 1971 in Billinge, Wigan) is an English retired football defender. His son, Will, plays for Fleetwood Town.

References

External links

1971 births
Living people
Footballers from Wigan
Association football defenders
English footballers
Wigan Athletic F.C. players
English Football League players
Lincoln City F.C. players
Preston North End F.C. players
Rochdale A.F.C. players